The  1993 Italian Superturismo Championship was the seventh edition. The season began in Monza on 21 March and finished in Mugello on 3 October, after ten rounds. Roberto Ravaglia won the championship, driving a BMW 318i; the German manufacturer won the constructors' championship, while Amato Ferrari won the privateers' trophy.

Teams and drivers

Race calendar and results

Championship standings

Drivers' Championship
{|
|valign="top"|

Manufacturers' Trophy

Privateers' Championship

External links
1993 Drivers List
1993 Standings

Italian Superturismo Championship